Jean-Baptiste Lavastre (24 August 1839 – 24 April 1891) was a French landscape painter and scenic designer.

Biography 
A student of Édouard Desplechin as soon as 1854 when he was only fifteen (and then his associate from 1864 to 1870), Jean-Baptiste Lavastre eventually took over the workshop with his brother Antoine and Eugène Carpezat. They worked for the Opéra Garnier as well as for the Comédie-Française and the Opéra-Comique in Paris.

For the Opéra Le Peletier, he realised the decors, inter alia, for Hamlet by Ambroise Thomas, Don Giovanni, L'Africaine by Giacomo Meyerbeer. The Opéra-Comique, whose ceiling he painted, owes him the setting for Jean de Nivelle and the forest of Lakmé by Léo Delibes, Manon by Jules Massenet and The Tales of Hoffmann by Jacques Offenbach.

He is the author, among others, of the ceiling of the théâtre de l'Ambigu-Comique.

In 1871, he lived at 2  in Paris.

Salons 
 1869 : Les Garrigues, environ de Nîmes;
 1872 : Bords de la Méditerranée;
 1873 : Une carrière près de Nîmes.

Bibliography 
 André Roussard, Dictionnaire des peintres à Montmartre, Éd. A. Roussard, Paris, 1999, p. 359 

19th-century French painters
French male painters
French landscape painters
French scenic designers
People from Nîmes
1839 births
1891 deaths
19th-century French male artists